Bradner's Pharmacy is located in Montclair, Essex County, New Jersey, United States. The building was built in 1926 and was added to the National Register of Historic Places on July 1, 1988.

See also
National Register of Historic Places listings in Essex County, New Jersey

References

Commercial buildings on the National Register of Historic Places in New Jersey
Commercial buildings completed in 1926
Buildings and structures in Essex County, New Jersey
Montclair, New Jersey
National Register of Historic Places in Essex County, New Jersey
New Jersey Register of Historic Places